Parochial is an adjective which may refer to:

 Parishes, in religion
Parish churches, also called parochial churches
Parochial church council, body within the Church of England
Parochial mission, in the Catholic church
 Parochial political culture, an aspect of a political system
 Parochial schools, primary or secondary schools affiliated to a religious organisation
 Parochialism, in psychology

See also 

 Extra-parochial area